On 29 July 2013, terrorists attacked on Dera Ismail Khan's central prison and freed more than 240 criminals including 35 high-profile terrorists. Tehreek-e-Taliban Pakistan claimed responsibility of attack.

Attack
The attackers first destroyed an armoured police vehicle outside prison and threw many Hand grenades on prison's security guards. According to a police official, militants were disguised in police uniform and were firing Rocket launchers from outside of prison, he said "Militants were firing rockets at the jail and I also heard gunfire from inside the building". Residents in Dera Ismail Khan reported hearing loud blasts and gunfires. About hundred militants (who were armed with Guns, mortars, Rocket-propelled grenades and bombs) attacked the prison. Militants launched their attack with series of explosion. Militants have also launched an attack on buildings surrounding the prison, including a radio station and a hospital. A nearby house was also reportedly attacked where the militants took the residents hostage and laid an ambush for security forces’ reinforcements. While attacking, the militants were shouting " God is great" and "Long live Taliban". The attackers then entered the prison and opened fires on police officers. The police officers fired and used Tear gas in retaliation. During attack, four police officers and five attackers were killed while several injured. The militants managed to free 300 prisoners.

References

2013 murders in Pakistan
21st-century mass murder in Pakistan
Terrorist incidents in Dera Ismail Khan
Prisons in Pakistan
Prison-related crime
Crime in Khyber Pakhtunkhwa
Terrorist incidents in Pakistan in 2013
Tehrik-i-Taliban Pakistan attacks